Tanzini is an Italian surname. Notable people with the surname include:

 Anna Tanzini (1914–?), Italian gymnast
 Athos Tanzini (1913–2008), Italian fencer
 Matt Tanzini (born 1976), American soccer player

Italian-language surnames